Onder de korenmaat is a novel by Dutch author Maarten 't Hart. It was first published in 1991.

Novels by Maarten 't Hart
1991 novels